The Kabekona River is a river of Minnesota. It empties into the Kabekona Bay of Leech Lake.

See also
List of rivers of Minnesota

References

Minnesota Watersheds
USGS Hydrologic Unit Map - State of Minnesota (1974)

Rivers of Minnesota
Rivers of Cass County, Minnesota